Mir-Susne-Hum (Mir-Setivi-Ho, Kan-iki or Otr-iki ) is a culture hero of the Samoyedic and Ugrian peoples. He was the seventh son of Num-Torum, the supreme god of the Ugrian people, and acted as a mediator between humans and the god Num-Torum. Because Mir-Susne-Hum's mother, Kaltes-Ekwa, was defeated by her husband in heaven, this meant that Mir-Susne-Hum had to be born on earth. His antagonist was Jelping-Ja-Oyka.

After a certain transformation, Mir-Susne-Hum was given an iron horse with eight wings.

Further reading
 Abenójar Sanjuán, Óscar. “La deidad obi-ugria El Hombre que Vigila el Mundo y el mito de la Estrella Alce”. In: Culturas Populares. Revista Electrónica 6 (enero-junio 2008). http://www.culturaspopulares.org/textos6/articulos/abenojar.htm; .

External links and references
"A rise of Mir-Susne-Hum." Graphic cycle dedicated to a national Ob-Ugrian (Ostyak - Hant and Vogul - Mansi) hero.
World view of the Hanti

Ob-Ugrian gods
Heroes in mythology and legend